Stress Zero is a Korean animated movie written and directed by Lee Dae-hee. It was released in South Korea on February 2021

Synopsis
One day, a huge monster appeared all over Seoul , causing confusion in Korea. Jjang-dol, As a result, lost his job due to the devastation, he wants to escape unemployment by selling ‘Stress Zero’ with his friends Dr. Ko and Ta-jo, but finds out that the drink is the only secret to stopping the monster

See also
South Korean animation

References

Animated films set in South Korea
South Korean animated films
2021 animated films